The Florida Marine Raiders (formerly the Lakeland Raiders) were a professional indoor football team; though they began play in 2012 as a member of the Ultimate Indoor Football League, for 2014 they became a charter member of the X-League Indoor Football (X-League). The Raiders were based in Lakeland, Florida, with home games played at the Lakeland Center. The Lakeland Raiders were founded by Michael Mink in his mother's vision of helping players get a second chance.

The Raiders were the second indoor football team to play in Lakeland, after the Lakeland Thunderbolts which played in the National Indoor Football League for the 2005 and 2006 seasons, then joined the American Indoor Football Association for the 2007 season, winning the league championship before folding that offseason.

At the conclusion of the 2013 UIFL season, the Raiders announced that they would be joining the newly formed X-League. On July 11, 2013, the franchise announced that they would be changing their name to the Florida Marine Raiders. In August 2015, the Marine Raiders announced they would not be returning in 2016.

2012 season

2013 season

2014 season

Players of note

Roster

All-League selections 
 RB Levi Raines, Jr. (1)
 WR Reggie Ellis (1)
 OL Adam Duckett (1)
 DL Kendrick Stewart (1)
 LB Prince Hall (1)
 DB Maurice Francois (1)

Awards and honors
The following is a list of all Raiders/Marine Raiders players who won league Awards

Season-by-season results

References

External links
Florida Marine Raiders official website

 
2014 establishments in Florida
2015 disestablishments in Florida